Boris Shpilevsky (born 20 August 1982) is a Russian former professional road bicycle racer, who rode professionally between 2007 and 2015.

Major results

2001
 9th Chrono Champenois
2003
 Grand Prix Guillaume Tell
1st Stages 4a & 5
 1st Stage 1 Triptyque des Barrages U23
2006
 1st Overall Giro del Friuli-Venezia Giulia
1st Stage 1b
 1st San Bernardino di Lugo
 1st Montecatini Terme
 8th Coppa della Pace
 10th Overall Giro di Toscana
2007
 1st Overall Flèche du Sud
1st Stages 2 & 4
 1st Clasica Internacional Txuma
 1st Firenze–Pistoia
 3rd Giro di Toscana
 7th Memorial Cimurri
 10th Overall Istrian Spring Trophy
 10th Giro della Romagna
2008
 1st Overall Tour of Hainan
1st Stages 1, 2, 4, 6, 7 & 9
 1st Stage 2 Tour of Belgium
 10th Firenze–Pistoia
2009
 Tour of Hainan
1st Stages 2, 6, 8 & 9
2010
 Tour of Qinghai Lake
1st Stages 7 & 8
 Tour du Maroc
1st Stages 5, 8 & 10
 Five Rings of Moscow
1st Stages 3 & 5
2011
 1st Overall Tour of Taihu Lake
1st Points classification
1st Stages 1 & 5
 Tour of China
1st Stages 4, 5, 6 & 7
 1st Stage 9 Tour de Langkawi
 1st Stage 1 Tour de East Java
2013
 1st Stage 1 Tour of Fuzhou
 3rd Overall Tour of Taihu Lake
 7th Tour of Nanjing
2014
 1st  Overall Tour of China II
1st  Points classification
1st Stages 2 & 5
 Tour of China I
1st  Points classification
1st Stage 7
 1st Stage 1 Tour of Fuzhou
 4th Overall Tour of Taihu Lake
1st Stages 5 & 9
2015
 3rd Overall Tour of China II

References

External links

Russian male cyclists
1982 births
Living people
Cyclists from Moscow